is a manga researcher and professor of global Japanese studies at Meiji University. She was born in Kumamoto Prefecture. She was an editor for Chikuma Shobō. She is a manga critic, gender theorist, family theorist, current events critic, author, sexologist, and a liberal feminist. She is a member of the Agency for Cultural Affairs awards selection committee. She is a member of the Japanese National Diet Library legal deposit deliberation committee.

History
She graduated from Kumamoto City Toen Junior High School, Kumamoto Prefectural Kumamoto High School, and Tokyo University. When she was searching for work, she decided on the book publisher company Chikuma Shobō.

She was a lecturer at Meiji Gakuin University and Waseda University while working on her job as an editor, working on publications related to female sexuality, communication theory, and world problems. She was present for the formation of the Japan Society for Studies in Cartoon and Comics and also a member on the board of directors.

Bibliography

(1998) Watashi no Ibasho wa Doku ni Aru no? Shōjo Manga ga Utsusu Kokoro no Katachi (私の居場所はどこにあるの? 少女マンガが映す心のかたち)

(1999) Kairaku Denryū Onna no, Yokubō, no Katachi (快楽電流 女の、欲望の、かたち Electric Currents of Pleasure The Shape of a Woman's Desire)
(2000) Shōjo Manga Damashī Genzai o Utsusu Shōjo Manga Kanzen Gaido&Interview Collection  (少女まんが魂 現在を映す少女まんが完全ガイド&インタビュー集)
(2004) Aijou  Hyōron 「Kazoku」 o Meguru Monogatari (愛情評論 「家族」をめぐる物語)
(2013) Kiwakiwa 「Itami」 o Meguru Monogatari (きわきわ　「痛み」をめぐる物語)

References

Comics critics
Japanese non-fiction writers
Japanese sexologists
Women sexologists
Japanese feminists
Gender studies academics
Academic staff of Meiji University
University of Tokyo alumni
People from Kumamoto Prefecture
1959 births
Living people
Academic staff of Waseda University